POWA, People Opposing Women Abuse, is a South African NGO established in 1979 which undertakes campaigns, projects and research related to violence against women in Africa. POWA was the first organisation in South Africa to establish a shelter for abused women in 1981. In 1999, at the time of the Tuli elephant cruelty case, POWA ran a controversial TV advertisement claiming that many people "care more for abused animals than for abused women".

Projects

Sector Capacity Building and Strengthening 
POWA provides training education and mentorship to women's groups so they understand the women's rights discourse and to formalise services that directly affect their current needs.

Law Reform 
POWA attempts to influence national, regional and international policy in ways that supports empowering and supporting women.

Rights Education 
The responsibility of their branch offices includes rights education through workshops and community meetings. lalalallaaa

Sheltering and counselling 
Free counselling and shelter is provided to all South African women that are in need of it. POWA has six satellite offices and two confidential shelters.

References

External links
Website

Organizations established in 1979
Women's rights organizations
Non-profit organizations based in Africa